Lake Wanapitei (also known as Lake Wahnapitae) occupies a meteorite crater in Sudbury, Ontario, Canada. It is located near the much larger Sudbury meteorite crater but they are not related.

It was evident by the mid-1970s that Wanapitei Lake was an impact crater. Remarkably, it lies on the eastern edge of the much older, larger Sudbury structure. Cobbles of suevite, crumbly impact breccia cobbles containing bits of dark glass, are found surrounding the lake. Some contain coesite, a high pressure mineral diagnostic of impact structures. The suevite is very close in appearance and composition to that described from the Ries impact crater.

In the 1960s, half a dozen RCMP officers accidentally drowned in the lake during a training exercise.

The lake is a popular recreational and residential area in Sudbury, with the neighborhoods of Skead and Boland's Bay located on its shores. With the municipal amalgamation of Greater Sudbury in 2001, it became the largest lake in the world completely contained within the boundaries of a single city. It inherited this status from Lake Ramsey, also in Sudbury.

The Wanapitei River flows through the lake. Wanapitei Provincial Park is located on the north shore of Lake Wanapitei — this is a non-operating park so there are no facilities. The lake has a number of small islands within it. Named islands include Blueberry, Howie, Pirate Island, Wanapitei, MacLennan, and Bonanza. Some of the islands are unpopulated, although a few have recreational cottages located on them. The small Wahnapitae Ojibwe reserve is also located on the lake's northwestern shore.

The lake's name comes from the Ojibwa word waanabidebiing, or "concave-tooth [shaped] water", which describes its shape. A nearby community which takes its name from the river is spelled Wahnapitae. However, the Wanapitei spelling is correct for both the lake and the river.

See also
List of lakes in Ontario

References

External links
Aerial Exploration of the Wanapitei Structure
Wanapitei Provincial Park

Wanapitei
Eocene impact craters
Bartonian Stage
Wanapitei, Lake
Geology of Greater Sudbury
Impact crater lakes